Plaza de toros de Jaén is a bullring in Jaén, Spain. It is currently used for bull fighting. The stadium holds 10,500 people. It was built in 1960.

References

Jaen
Sports venues in Andalusia
Buildings and structures in Jaén, Spain
Sport in Jaén, Spain